Alabama Territory's at-large congressional district was the congressional district for the Alabama Territory.

List of delegates representing the district 
On March 3, 1817, the Alabama Territory was created. A non-voting delegate was elected at-large beginning January 29, 1818.

Notes

References 

Territory
Former congressional districts of the United States
At-large United States congressional districts
Constituencies established in 1817
Constituencies disestablished in 1819